Jonathan Greenard (born May 25, 1997) is an American football defensive end for the Houston Texans of the National Football League (NFL). He played college football at Louisville and Florida.

Early life and high school
Greenard grew up in Hiram, Georgia and attended Hiram High School, where he played basketball and football. As a senior, he was named the 5-A regional defensive player of the year. Rated a three-star recruit, Greenard committed to play college football at Louisville over Kentucky.

College career
Greenard was a member of the Louisville Cardinals, redshirting his true freshman season. He was a key reserve at linebacker as a redshirt freshman recording 22 tackles (seven for loss) and 2.5 sacks along with two passes broken up and an interception, which he returned 42 yards for a touchdown. He made his first career start in the 2016 Citrus Bowl, making five tackles (1.5 for loss). Greenard became a starter for the Cardinals in his redshirt sophomore season and led the team with 15.5 tackles and tied for the team lead with seven sacks. Greenard dislocated his wrist in the first series of first game of his redshirt junior season against Alabama and was forced to miss the entire season. He announced that he would be transferring to the University of Florida at the end of the season.

While injured as a redshirt junior, Greenard took extra courses in order to graduate a semester early and was able to enroll at Florida in January 2019 as a graduate transfer. He was named the Southeastern Conference co-Defensive Lineman of the Week after making six tackles with 1.5 sacks against Miami in his first game as a Gator. Greenard finished the season with 52 tackles, 15.5 tackles for loss and 9.5 sacks with three forced fumbles, a fumble recovery, four passes defended and an interception.

Professional career

Greenard was drafted by the Houston Texans in the third round, 90th overall, of the 2020 NFL Draft. On May 14, 2020, Greenard signed a four-year contract with the Texans that included a nearly $900,000 signing bonus. Greenard made his NFL debut on October 4, 2020 against the Minnesota Vikings. In Week 11 against the New England Patriots, Greenard recorded his first career sack on Cam Newton during the 27–20 win. Greenard finished his rookie season with 19 tackles, two tackles for loss, and one sack in 13 games played with one start.

On October 22, 2022, Greenard was placed on injured reserve. He was activated on December 17.

References

External links
Louisville Cardinals bio
Florida Gators bio
Houston Texans bio

1997 births
Living people
People from Paulding County, Georgia
Players of American football from Georgia (U.S. state)
American football linebackers
Louisville Cardinals football players
Florida Gators football players
Houston Texans players